Cook, Serve, Delicious! is a restaurant simulation video game released in 2012, developed and published by Vertigo Gaming. The player controls the menu and running of a restaurant, with in game currency being awarded by correctly filling customer orders. Directed by David Galindo, it had art from Sara Gross and music from Johnathan Geer. The game was released on October 5, 2012, for PC, and for Steam after a period on Steam Greenlight from October 8, 2013. It was later ported to iOS and Android. A sequel, Cook, Serve, Delicious! 2, was released on September 13, 2017, and its second sequel, Cook, Serve, Delicious! 3, was released on October 14, 2020; a third sequel Cook Serve Forever is scheduled for release in 2023. Cook, Serve, Delicious! drew inspiration from Japan-only 1999 game Ore no Ryouri.

Gameplay

Cook, Serve, Delicious! centres on an old, worn down restaurant in need of repair. The tower building in which the restaurant is included has had its business drop, but management has tasked the player with changing that fortune. The player is given money, and a choice of twenty foods to place on the menu, but this can be increased by purchasing new equipment for the kitchen. Customers will ask for a variety of food and drink, as well as sauces, additions and toppings.

A series of eight cooking stations are used to cook food simultaneously, known in-game as "prep stations". Prepping food requires navigating to the customer's order at the given prep station, and then following specific steps to complete it, given as keyboard button prompts. Orders can be customized by the customer such as different toppings on a hamburger. Some meals require cooking time, during which other orders can be completed. A completed meal is graded by how well it was cooked - missing steps or ingredients, adding wrong ingredients, or not cooking it properly can lead to lower grades and a lower income for the day. The day cycle includes rush hours at lunch and dinner, prompting more customers to come in during those times. Alongside cooking, chores to keep the restaurant sanitary, such as washing dishes, throwing out the garbage, and flushing the lavatory have to be completed, each following a similar approach to complete as cooking food.

Between days, the player can adjust their menu, buying new recipes, equipment or decorations with money earned. Recipe changes are necessary to keep customers coming, as serving too many fattening or boring foods at the same time will turn customers away, while serving the same foods day-in and day-out will cause them to become stale and less attractive to customers.

Development and release
Cook, Serve Delicious! was designed and produced by Vertigo Gaming in October 2012. It was developed by David Galindo, with art from Sara Gross and music from Johnathan Geer. Among the inspirations for the game was the PlayStation game Ore no Ryouri, which was released exclusively in Japan in 1999. Galindo had obtained a demo for the game through a gaming magazine and was intrigued by the approach and rush of the title, and inspired him to create a fan-lead version in 2004, using hand-drawn graphics. While the game was popular and he wanted to make a sequel, he lacked the funds to develop it. However, after releasing The Oil Blue, his first attempt at a full game, he had $10,000 to put towards the project.

Work started on Cook, Serve Delicious! around March 2012, with plan to release in mid-2012 as to hit during the mid-year lull of major releases. As Galindo was not a programmer, he used GameMaker Studio 8.1, which at the time was in beta development for creating Microsoft Windows releases and later would be expanded to include Android and iOS support later; he wanted to get the game released for Windows first and then release other versions once the full GameMaker Studio version was out. The game was released October 5, 2012 on PC, and then on iOS and Android on December 16, 2012, and July 29, 2013, respectively. Downloadable content was released for the game, with the name: Cook, Serve, Delicious: Extra Crispy Edition, which added ten new foods, new music tracks, controller support and support for local cooperative gameplay.

Reception
Mal Scott of The Stereogram was very positive about the game, commenting that despite the game being reasonably basic, it was "much, much more than the sum of its parts." Scott also commented that the game was difficult, dubbing it the "Dark Souls of cooking games". Matt Porter of Hooked Gamers gave the game a 7.4 out of 10 rating, commenting that the game is 'surprisingly difficult at times', and that it 'has a lot of charm', but also called the game 'repetitive'. Touch Arcade Jon Polson gave the iPad version four and a half stars, but did not think the simplified controls made the game better. Lucy Ingram of 148Apps reviewed the app version and observed that the game took "the best elements of every restaurant simulation game" and was "one of the most enjoyable and addictive games [she] ever played." She also praised the game's soundtrack and gameplay, saying that "the ultra-smooth touch controls make Cook, Serve, Delicious a joy to play."

Sequels
Vertigo Gaming announced that a sequel to the game, entitled Cook, Serve, Delicious! 2 was to be released on August 24, 2017, and also for a release on MacOS, Linux, and PlayStation 4. The game was delayed, and eventually released on September 13, 2017. Cook, Serve, Delicious! 2 boasted over 180 food types, in comparison to the original's 30, with food being split into entrées, side dishes and drinks. It has also added improved graphics, as well as the ability to customise the restaurant's aesthetics.

Cook, Serve, Delicious! 3 was announced in August 2019 with planned early access release in January 2020. The game is planned for Microsoft Windows, PlayStation 4, Xbox One, and Nintendo Switch. The game fully released on October 14, 2020. The sequel is more story-driven than the previous games, taking place in an apocalyptic future, with the player a human chef aboard a food truck manned by robotic assistants, competing in a national food truck championship. Reflecting this, the game eliminates the chores of running the restaurant, while the player must be ready to serve numerous dishes when they arrive at each stop along the route. Cook Serve Forever is planned for release in early access in April 2023, along with a demo that was launched in January 2023. Vertigo considered Cook Serve Forever their biggest cooking game to date yet.

References

External links 
 Cook, Serve, Delicious! website

2012 video games
Android (operating system) games
Cooking video games
GameMaker Studio games
IOS games
MacOS games
Multiplayer and single-player video games
Vertigo Gaming games
Video games developed in the United States
Windows games